Turkey is scheduled to compete at the 2024 Summer Olympics in Paris from 26 July to 11 August 2024. Since the nation's official debut in 1908, Turkish athletes have appeared in every edition of the Summer Olympic Games, except for three occasions: the 1920 Summer Olympics in Antwerp, the 1932 Summer Olympics in Los Angeles at the period of worldwide Great Depression, and the 1980 Summer Olympics in Moscow as part of the United States-led boycott.

Competitors
The following is the list of number of competitors in the Games.

Athletics

Turkish track and field athletes achieved the entry standards for Paris 2024, either by passing the direct qualifying mark (or time for track and road races) or by world ranking, in the following events (a maximum of 3 athletes each):

Track and road events

References

2024
Nations at the 2024 Summer Olympics
2024 in Turkish sport